Randall Scott Karl (born August 9, 1971), is a  former professional baseball player who pitched in the Major Leagues from 1995–2000. Karl played for the Milwaukee Brewers, Colorado Rockies, and Anaheim Angels. He wore uniform number 42 prior to Major League Baseball retiring the number to honor Jackie Robinson.

References

External links

Milwaukee Brewers players
Colorado Rockies players
Anaheim Angels players
1971 births
Hawaii Rainbow Warriors baseball players
Major League Baseball pitchers
Nashville Sounds players
Living people
Baseball players from California